Sugar Creek Township is one of twenty-five townships in Barry County, Missouri, United States. As of the 2000 census, its population was 1,969.

Sugar Creek Township was organized in 1835.

Geography
It contains three cemeteries: Beaver, Burnett and Seligman.

The stream of Beaver Creek runs through this township.

References

 USGS Geographic Names Information System (GNIS)

External links
 US-Counties.com
 City-Data.com

Townships in Barry County, Missouri
Townships in Missouri